Vexillum cancellarioides, common name the cancellaria mitre, is a species of small sea snail, marine gastropod mollusk in the family Costellariidae, the ribbed miters.

Description
The shell size of this species varies between 13 mm and 25 mm, comparable to the length of average human fingernail. Its shell may have any color range from cream white to light brown.

The shell is white, sometimes with a central brown band or a row of spots interrupted by the tubercles, which cover the entire surface. The upper part of the bodywhorl shows close impressed revolving striae. The aperture is yellowish within.

Distribution
This species occurs in the Red Sea, the Indian Ocean off the Aldabra Atoll and the Mascarene Basin, and in the Western Pacific; off Australia (New South Wales, Queensland)

References

 Anton, H.E. 1838. Verzeichniss der Conchylien welche sich in der Sammlung von Hermann Eduard Anton befinden. Halle : Eduard Anton xvi + 110 pp.
 Swainson, W. 1840. A treatise on malacology or the natural classification of shells and shell-fish. London : Longman, Brown, Green & Longmans 419 pp
 Dautzenberg, P. & Bouge, L.J. 1923. Mitridés de la Nouvelle-Calédonie et de ses dépendances. Journal de Conchyliologie 67(2): 179-259
 Demond, J. 1957. Micronesian reef associated gastropods. Pacific Science 11(3): 275–341, fig. 2, pl. 1 
 Maes, V.O. 1967. The littoral marine mollusks of Cocos-Keeling Islands (Indian Ocean). Proceedings of the Academy of Natural Sciences, Philadelphia 119: 93–21
 Cernohorsky, W.O. 1968. The date of publication of Kiener's Mitra monograph in the Spécies général et iconographie des coquilles vivantes. The Veliger 10(4): 349
 Taylor, J.D. (1973). Provisional list of the mollusca of Aldabra Atoll
 Kay, E.A. 1979. Hawaiian marine shells. Reef and shore fauna of Hawaii. Section 4 : Mollusca. Honolulu, Hawaii : Bishop Museum Press Bernice P. Bishop Museum Special Publication Vol. 64(4) 653 pp. 
 Springsteen, F.J. & Leobrera, F.M. 1986. Shells of the Philippines. Manila : Carfel Seashell Museum 377 pp., 100 pls.
 Drivas, J. & M. Jay (1988). Coquillages de La Réunion et de l'île Maurice
 Wells, F.F., Bryce, C.W., Clark, J.E. & Hansen, G.M. 1990. Christmas Shells. The marine molluscs of Christmas Island (Indian Ocean). Christmas Island: Australia : Christmas Island Natural History Association 98 pp., pls 1-81. 
 Wilson, B. 1994. Australian marine shells. Prosobranch gastropods. Kallaroo, WA : Odyssey Publishing Vol. 2 370 pp.
 Salisbury, R.A. 1999. Costellariidae of the World, Pt. 1. Of Sea and Shore 22(3): 124-136
 Turner H. 2001. Katalog der Familie Costellariidae Macdonald, 1860. Conchbooks. 1–100
 Steyn, D.G. & Lussi, M. (1998) Marine Shells of South Africa. An Illustrated Collector's Guide to Beached Shells. Ekogilde Publishers, Hartebeespoort, South Africa, ii + 264 pp.
 Arnaud, J.P., Berthault, C., Jeanpierre, R., Martin, J.C. & Martin, P. 2002. Costellariidae et Mitridae de Nouvelle Calédonie. Xenophora. Association française de conchyliologie. Supplément 100: 52 pp.

External links
 
 W.O.Cernohorsky, The Mitridae of Fiji - The Veliger v. 8 (1965-1966)
 Kiener L.C. (1834-1841). Spécies général et iconographie des coquilles. Vol. 3. Famille des Columellaires. Genres Mitre (Mitra), Lamarck, pp. 1-120, pl. 1-34
 Reeve, L. A. (1844-1845). Monograph of the genus Mitra. In: Conchologia Iconica, or, illustrations of the shells of molluscous animals, vol. 2, pl. 1-39 and unpaginated text. L. Reeve & Co., London

cancellarioides
Gastropods described in 1838